Mašek (feminine Mašková) is a Czech surname. Notable people include:

 Albín Mašek (1804-1878), Czech choirmaster and composer, son of Vincenc
 Dominik Mašek, Czech footballer
 Ervín Mašek (b. 1967), Czech ice hockey player
 Hana Mašková, Czech figure skater
 Ivan Mašek, Czech politician
 Jiří Mašek (b. 1978), Czech footballer
 Kamilo Mašek (1831–1859), Czech composer, son of Kašpar
 Karel Mašek (1867-1922; pseudonym Fa Presto), Czech poet
 Karel Vítězslav Mašek (1865-1927), Czech painter
 Kašpar Mašek (or Gašpar) (1794-1873), Czech composer, son of Vincenc
 Martina Mašková, Czech ice hockey player
 Pavel Mašek (1761–1826), Czech composer, brother of Vincenc
 Václav Mašek, Czech footballer
 Vincenc Mašek (1755–1831), Bohemian composer

See also
Macek, surname

Czech-language surnames